Clube Centenário Pauferrense, commonly known as Centenário Pauferrense, is a Brazilian football club based in Pau dos Ferros, Rio Grande do Norte state.

History
The club was founded on October 31, 1956. They won the Campeonato Potiguar Second Level in 2009.

Achievements

 Campeonato Potiguar Second Level:
 Winners (1): 2009

Stadium
Clube Centenário Pauferrense play their home games at Estádio Nove de Janeiro. The stadium has a maximum capacity of 2,000 people.

References

Football clubs in Rio Grande do Norte
Association football clubs established in 1956
1956 establishments in Brazil